() was a luxury vehicle division of Japanese automaker Mazda that operated between 1991 and 1997 in Japan only. Its inception as a brand emerged in the late 1980s when Mazda diversified its sales channels in the Japanese market with the launch of three new marques. This selective marketing experiment ended in the mid-1990s due to economic conditions, largely attributed to the collapse of the Japanese asset price bubble in 1991. As a brand,  encompassed most, if not all dealers formerly under the "Mazda Auto Store" dealership network established in 1959 when the Mazda R360 was introduced. Pronounced like the French word infini, the name is written with a tilde over the lowercase Greek ε (as in ɛ̃), and can therefore be assumed to be IPA, the pronunciation symbols taught in Japan, and sometimes used in product naming.

The  marque was a luxury-oriented brand, as opposed to the more mainstream, fun to drive Eunos brand, traditional Mazda, and entry level Autozam. Both shared the V6 2.0 L, while the MS-6 offered the convenience of a hatchback bodystyle, and the MS-8 offered space efficiency of bench seats for both front and rear passengers and the open-air feeling of a hardtop sedan bodystyle.

The  name and logo are not to be confused with several limited-edition second generation (FC) RX-7s, the "Infini" edition (marked with an infinity sign "∞"), from the late 1980s.

From 1991 until 1997, when the  dealership was integrated into Mazda locations, Citroën products were sold to Japanese buyers, as well as Mazda's Eunos locations. Currently, there are a few Japanese Mazda dealerships that still maintain the sales channels, but sell Mazda-branded products.

Models 

  MS-6 hatchback — 1991–1994 (based on Mazda Cronos sedan; Mazda 626 hatchback for export)
  MS-8 sedan — 1992–1997 (only unique model to the brand)
  MS-9 sedan — 1991–1993 (rebadged Mazda Sentia)
  RX-7 coupe — 1991–1997 (rebadged Mazda RX-7)
  MPV minivan — 1991–1997 (rebadged Mazda MPV)
 Citroën XM
 Citroën Xantia

References

External links 
 Mazda RX-7 History (via Internet Archive)

Cars of Japan
Mazda
 
Luxury motor vehicle manufacturers
Japanese luxury motor vehicle marques
Vehicle manufacturing companies established in 1991
Vehicle manufacturing companies disestablished in 1997